Crambus gausapalis is a moth in the family Crambidae. It was described by George Duryea Hulst in 1886. It is found in North America, where it has been recorded from California.

References

Crambini
Moths described in 1886
Moths of North America